Andugulapadu is a village in Guntur district of the Indian state of Andhra Pradesh. It is located in Vinukonda mandal of Narasaraopet revenue division.

Demographics
As of 2011 India census, Andugulapadu had a population of 2878 comprising 49.8% male population and females 50.1%. Andugulapadu has an average literacy rate of 45.65%, lower than the national average of 74%: male literacy is 62.86%, and female literacy is 37.13%. In Andugulapadu, 11% of the population is under 6 years of age.

See also 
List of villages in Guntur district

References

Villages in Guntur district